Antilla is a village and rural municipality in Salta Province in northwestern Argentina. It is located southeast of the city of Rosario de la Frontera through National Route 34 at km 931.

Population
Antilla had 619 inhabitants (INDEC, 2001), representing an increase of 20% compared with the 516 inhabitants (INDEC, 1991) of the previous census.

References

External links

Populated places in Salta Province